Al-Khalis Sport Club, is an Iraqi football team based in Diyala, that plays in the Iraq Division Two.

Managerial history
 Ibrahim Ali Yas

See also
 2002–03 Iraq FA Cup
 2020–21 Iraq FA Cup

References

External links
 Al-Khalis SC on Goalzz.com
 Iraq Clubs- Foundation Dates

Football clubs in Diyala